Thomasville is the county seat of Thomas County, Georgia, United States. The population was 18,413 at the 2010 United States Census, making it the second largest city in southwest Georgia after Albany.

The city deems itself the "City of Roses" and holds an annual Rose Festival. The city features plantations open to the public, a historic downtown, a large farmer's market, and an oak tree from about 1680 at the corner of Monroe and Crawford streets.

History
Thomasville was founded in 1825 as seat of the newly formed Thomas County. It was incorporated as a town in 1831 and as a city in 1889. The community was named for Jett Thomas, a general in the War of 1812.

Geography
It is the second largest city in Southwest Georgia after Albany. The city has three U.S. Routes: 19, 84 and 319. It is located 34 miles northeast of Tallahassee, Florida, 28 miles southwest of Moultrie, 43 miles west of Valdosta, 95 miles east of Dothan, Alabama, 59 miles south of Albany and 22 miles north of Monticello, Florida.

Climate
The climate in this area is characterized by hot, humid summers and generally mild to cool winters.  According to the Köppen Climate Classification system, Thomasville has a humid subtropical climate, abbreviated "Cfa" on climate maps.

Demographics

2020 census

As of the 2020 United States Census, there were 18,881 people, 7,529 households, and 4,983 families residing in the city.

2000 census
As of the census of 2000, there were 18,162 people, 7,021 households, and 4,654 families residing in the city. The racial makeup of the city was 55.39% African American, 42.83% White, 0.23% Native American, 0.53% Asian, 0.01% Pacific Islander, 0.24% from other races, and 0.78% from two or more races. Hispanic or Latino of any race were 1.28% of the population.

There were 7,021 households, out of which 30.8% had children under the age of 18 living with them, 39.7% were married couples living together, 22.7% had a female householder with no husband present, and 33.7% were non-families. 29.7% of all households were made up of individuals, and 12.7% had someone living alone who was 65 years of age or older.  The average household size was 2.47 and the average family size was 3.06.

In the city, the population was spread out, with 26.9% under the age of 18, 8.7% from 18 to 24, 26.8% from 25 to 44, 21.5% from 45 to 64, and 16.2% who were 65 years of age or older.  The median age was 36 years. For every 100 females, there were 83.3 males.  For every 100 females age 18 and over, there were 78.0 males.

The median income for a household in the city was $29,926, and the median income for a family was $37,606. Males had a median income of $28,331 versus $12,312 for females. The per capita income for the city was $15,910.  About 15.1% of families and 19.0% of the population were below the poverty line, including 25.1% of those under age 18 and 21.0% of those age 65 or over.

Economy
The bakery company Flowers Foods is based in Thomasville. Senior Life Insurance Company and Archbold Medical Center are also based in Thomasville.

Arts and culture
Thomasville plants and maintains more than 1,000 roses located throughout the city, as do a number of residents who have their own rose gardens.  During the last week of April, rose growers from all over the world display their prize roses for a panel of judges. The Thomasville Rose Garden at Cherokee Lake Park is the largest of 85 rose beds maintained by the city, and is host to the annual rose festival.

Thomasville is home to several historic and cultural organizations, including the Thomas County Historical Society and Museum of History, Thomasville Landmarks, Inc. the Thomasville Center for the Arts, the Jack Hadley Black History Museum, and Pebble Hill Plantation. Daily tours and research hours are available at each institution.

An Annual MLK (Rev. Dr. Martin Luther King, Jr.) Walk and Festival is held there in January of each year since 2009.

Education

Thomasville City School District 
The Thomasville City School District serves pre-school to grade twelve, and consists of three elementary schools, a middle school, and a high school, Thomasville High School. The district has 204 full-time teachers and over 3,107 students.

Thomas County School District 
The Thomas County School District serves pre-school to grade twelve, and consists of three elementary schools, a middle school, and two high schools, Thomas County Central High School and Bishop Hall Charter School. The district has 329 full-time teachers and over 5,466 students.

Private schools 
Thomasville Christian School (Pre-K - 9)
Brookwood School (Pre-K-12) Independent college preparatory school.

Higher education 
Thomas University - Main Campus
Southern Regional Technical College - Main Campus

Media

Newspaper 
 The Thomasville Times-Enterprise is a daily newspaper owned by Community Newspaper Holdings, CNHI. The newspaper publishes the glossy magazine Thomasville Scene.

Radio
 WPAX 1240 AM
 WHGH
 WSTT

Infrastructure
The city has installed a fiber optic network, known as CNS, which provides affordable, high speed Internet access. The city's network has been in place since 1999.  The city transfers excess revenues from CNS services and from its other utilities to the city's general fund to pay for police and fire protection, street maintenance, and other essential services. In 2012, because of these revenues, the city was able to eliminate property fire tax for its residents and businesses.

Notable people

 William Andrews – NFL player for Atlanta Falcons
 Lloyd J. Austin – U.S. Army, United States Secretary of Defense
 Stephanie Bentley – country music artist
 Mike Bobo – college football coach
 Elbridge Bryant – singer and one of the founding members of The Temptations
 Joe Burns – running back for the Georgia Tech Yellow Jackets and NFL's Buffalo Bills
 Benjamin Butterworth – U.S. Representative from Ohio
 Joelle Carter – actress
 Robert Carter (born 1994) - basketball player in the Israeli Basketball Premier League
 Tashard Choice – running back for Georgia Tech and NFL's Dallas Cowboys
 Reshard Cliett – NFL player
 Danny Copeland – NFL safety for Washington Redskins (Super Bowl XXVII championship team)
 Henry Elrod – U.S. Marine captain, posthumously awarded Medal of Honor for actions on Wake Island, 1941
 Harris English – professional golfer
 Mary Lena Faulk – professional golfer, 1953 winner of US Women's Amateur Championship; one of the founders of the LPGA
 Henry Ossian Flipper – first African American graduate of West Point in 1877
 Myron Guyton – NFL safety for New York Giants and New England Patriots
 Raymond Hughes – conductor and Metropolitan Opera chorus master
 Clifford Ivory – NFL and CFL football player
 Shawn Jones – football player, quarterback for Georgia Tech including 1990 National Championship team, safety for the Minnesota Vikings
 Rolf Kauka – German cartoonist (died in Thomasville)
 Sam Madison – NFL defensive back for Miami Dolphins and New York Giants
 Guy McIntyre – NFL player for San Francisco 49ers, Green Bay Packers, Philadelphia Eagles
 Delia Owens - author
 Marcus Stroud – NFL defensive tackle
 Edward Thomas – gridiron football player
 Brandon Thompson – NFL player
 Dina Titus – member of the U.S House of Representatives from Nevada's 1st District
 Theo Titus - Georgia state legislator, journalist, writer, and businessman
 Charlie Ward Jr. – Heisman Trophy-winning quarterback for Florida State football, basketball player for NBA's New York Knicks, assistant coach for Houston Rockets
 Bailey White – author
 Scott Wilson – actor
 Sheddrick Wilson – NFL player
 Joanne Woodward – Academy Award-winning actress, philanthropist, wife of actor Paul Newman
 Andrew Young – civil rights leader, minister, ambassador to the United Nations

References

External links

 City of Thomasville official website
 Thomasville Welcome Page
 Downtown Thomasville
 Thomasville Landmarks - Historic preservation organization
 The Thomasville Townie - The Insider's Guide to Thomasville
 South Georgia Historic Newspapers Archive Digital Library of Georgia

Cities in Georgia (U.S. state)
Micropolitan areas of Georgia (U.S. state)
Cities in Thomas County, Georgia
County seats in Georgia (U.S. state)